The 2020 Rally Monza (also known as ACI Rally Monza 2020) was a motor racing event for rally cars that was scheduled to hold between 3 to 6 December 2020. It marked the forty-first running of Monza Rally Show and was the final round of the 2020 World Rally Championship, World Rally Championship-2, World Rally Championship-3. It was also the final round of the Junior World Rally Championship. The event was based in the famous Autodromo Nazionale di Monza circuit near Milan, where the Italian Grand Prix is held.

Sébastien Ogier and Julien Ingrassia won the rally. Their team, Toyota Gazoo Racing WRT, were the manufacturers' rally winners. Mads Østberg and Torstein Eriksen were the winners in the WRC-2 category. Andreas Mikkelsen and Anders Jæger-Amland winners in the WRC-3 category. Tom Kristensson and Henrik Appelskog won the junior class.

Ogier and Ingrassia won their seventh world titles, while Hyundai Shell Mobis WRT secured their second consecutive manufacturers' titles.  Østberg and Eriksen won the WRC-2 championship, while Toksport WRT claimed the teams' titles. Jari Huttunen and Mikko Lukka became WRC-3 crowned champions. Kristensson and Appelskog sealed junior world titles.

Background

Championship standings prior to the event
Elfyn Evans and Scott Martin entered the round with a fourteen-point lead over six-time world champions Sébastien Ogier and Julien Ingrassia. Thierry Neuville and Nicolas Gilsoul are third, a further ten points behind. In the World Rally Championship for Manufacturers, defending manufacturers' champions Hyundai Shell Mobis WRT held a seven-point lead over Toyota Gazoo Racing WRT, following by M-Sport Ford WRT.

In the World Rally Championship-2 standings, Pontus Tidemand and Patrick Barth held an eighteen-point lead ahead of Mads Østberg and Torstein Eriksen in the drivers' and co-drivers' standings respectively, with Adrien Fourmaux and Renaud Jamoul in third. In the manufacturer' championship, Toksport WRT led Hyundai Motorsport N by forty-five points. M-Sport Ford WRT sit in third, a further fourteen points behind.

In the World Rally Championship-3 standings, Marco Bulacia Wilkinson led Jari Huttunen by two points in the drivers' standing, with Kajetan Kajetanowicz in third. The co-drivers' standing was led by Mikko Lukka. Maciek Szczepaniak and Marcelo Der Ohannesian hold second and third respectively.

In the Junior championship, Mārtiņš Sesks and Renars Francis led Tom Kristensson and Joakim Sjöberg by eight points. Sami Pajari and Marko Salminen were third, four points further back. In the Nations' championships, Latvia held an eight-point lead over Sweden, with Finland in third.

Schedule changes and event inclusion

The event was included in the 2020 World Rally Championship as the final round of the season due to the COVID-19 pandemic.

Entry list
The following crews entered into the rally. The event was open to crews competing in the World Rally Championship, its support categories, the World Rally Championship-2, World Rally Championship-3, and Junior World Rally Championship and privateer entries that were not registered to score points in any championship. Ninety-five entries were received, with eleven crews entered World Rally Cars, four Group R5 cars entered in the World Rally Championship-2 and thirteen in the World Rally Championship-3. A further six crews entered in the Junior World Rally Championship in Ford Fiesta R2s.

Route
The first and last day of action, including the Power Stage, followed Monza Rally Show to take place in stages inside the Autodromo Nazionale di Monza, while the second leg was focused on public stages north of Bergamo in the foothills of the Alps.

Itinerary

All dates and times were CEST (UTC+2).

Report

World Rally Cars
Dani Sordo and Carlos del Barrio held a narrow lead going onto Saturday, despite a ten-second time penalty for cutting a chicane. Teammate Thierry Neuville and Nicolas Gilsoul's title hope was washed away as their i20 was drawn out when the engine expired in heavy standing water after damaging their right-front suspension. Teemu Suninen and Jarmo Lehtinen retired from the rally because of an unfixable misfiring engine. Championship situation was shifted on Saturday as Elfyn Evans and Scott Martin went off road in the afternoon loop. Other major retirements of the day included Gus Greensmith and Elliott Edmondson, and Ole Christian Veiby and Jonas Andersson. Eventually, Sébastien Ogier and Julien Ingrassia won the event, which was enough to overhaul their teammate Evans and Martin to snatch their seventh world titles.

Classification

Special stages

Championship standings
Bold text indicates 2020 World Champions.

World Rally Championship-2
Adrien Fourmaux and Renaud Jamoul led the category, but a right-rear puncture lost their lead to Pontus Tidemand and Patrik Barth. Mads Østberg and Torstein Eriksen turned the tables to their favour on Saturday. The Norwegian crew eventually won the class to seal the WRC-2 titles.

Classification

Special stages

Championship standings
Bold text indicates 2020 World Champions.

World Rally Championship-3
Andreas Mikkelsen and Anders Jæger-Amland avoided any drama to lead the class. The Norwegian crew ran as high as third in the overall standings. However, their lead was narrowed by Oliver Solberg and Aaron Johnston by the end of the second leg. Mikkelsen and Jæger-Amland refused to give their lead away and eventually won the category. Jari Huttunen and Mikko Lukka became WRC-3 crowned champions.

Classification

Special stages

Championship standings
Bold text indicates 2020 World Champions.

Junior World Rally Championship
Tom Kristensson and Joakim Sjöberg comfortably led the class, while their title rivals Mārtiņš Sesks and Renars Francis, and Sami Pajari and Marko Salminen both in trouble. Championship leader Sesks and Francis' rally went even worse when they crashed out on Saturday. Kristensson and Sjöberg comfortably brought the car home to put the victory in their pockets, and with that, junior world titles in hands.

Classification

Special stages

Championship standings
Bold text indicates 2020 World Champions.

Notes

References

External links
  
 2020 Rally Monza at ewrc-results.com
 The official website of the World Rally Championship

Italy
2020 in Italian motorsport
December 2020 sports events in Italy
2020